Fritz Enskat (born 1 January 1939) is a German former diver. He competed in the men's 10 metre platform event at the 1960 Summer Olympics.

References

External links
 

1939 births
Living people
German male divers
Olympic divers of the United Team of Germany
Divers at the 1960 Summer Olympics
People from Kelheim (district)
Sportspeople from Lower Bavaria
20th-century German people